Bur Mahalleh (also Romanized as Būr Maḩalleh) is a village in Dabuy-ye Jonubi Rural District, Dabudasht District, Amol County, Mazandaran Province, Iran. At the 2006 census, its population was 186, in 48 families.

References 

Populated places in Amol County